The 2002 Stanley Cup playoffs, the playoff tournament of the National Hockey League began on April 17, 2002.

The Detroit Red Wings defeated the Carolina Hurricanes on June 13, 2002, four games to one, to win their tenth championship in their history. The Carolina Hurricanes were in the Stanley Cup Finals for the first time in their 23-year history, which includes their tenure as the Hartford Whalers. Red Wings defenceman Nicklas Lidstrom was awarded the Conn Smythe Trophy as the MVP of the playoffs. It was the ninth championship for Red Wings coach Scotty Bowman, who announced his retirement after the deciding game of the series. The Phoenix Coyotes played their last playoff games at America West Arena and missed the playoffs until 2010, when they played in Glendale.

The 16 teams that qualified, eight from each conference, played best-of-seven series for conference quarterfinals, semifinals and championships, and then the conference champions played a best-of-seven series for the Stanley Cup. A record 25 shutouts were recorded in the 2002 Playoffs and, for the first time since 1991, not a single team was swept in a playoff series. This is the last time that all three Eastern Canada teams made the playoffs together and got past the first round. For the first time since entering the NHL, both teams from the province of Alberta, the Calgary Flames and the Edmonton Oilers missed the playoffs in the same season.

Playoff seeds

Eastern Conference
Boston Bruins, Northeast Division champions, Eastern Conference regular season champions – 101 points
Philadelphia Flyers, Atlantic Division champions – 97 points
Carolina Hurricanes, Southeast Division champions – 91 points
Toronto Maple Leafs – 100 points
New York Islanders – 96 points
New Jersey Devils – 95 points
Ottawa Senators – 94 points
Montreal Canadiens – 87 points

Western Conference
Detroit Red Wings, Central Division champions, Western Conference regular season champions, Presidents' Trophy winners – 116 points
Colorado Avalanche, Northwest Division champions – 99 points (45 wins)
San Jose Sharks, Pacific Division champions – 99 points (44 wins)
St. Louis Blues – 98 points
Chicago Blackhawks – 96 points
Phoenix Coyotes – 95 points (40 wins, 7 points head-to-head vs. Los Angeles)
Los Angeles Kings – 95 points (40 wins, 3 points head-to-head vs. Phoenix)
Vancouver Canucks – 94 points

Playoff bracket

Conference Quarterfinals

Eastern Conference Quarterfinals

(1) Boston Bruins vs. (8) Montreal Canadiens 

The Boston Bruins finished first in the Eastern Conference during the regular season with 101 points. The Montreal Canadiens qualified as the eighth seed earning 87 points during the regular season. This was the twenty-ninth playoff series between the Bruins and the Canadiens, with Montreal winning twenty-one of the twenty-eight previous series. They last met in the 1994 Eastern Conference Quarterfinals, which Boston won in seven games.

(2) Philadelphia Flyers vs. (7) Ottawa Senators 

The Philadelphia Flyers entered the playoffs as the second seed in the Eastern Conference after winning the Atlantic Division with 97 points. The Ottawa Senators earned the seventh seed with 94 points. This was the first playoff series played between the two franchises. The Flyers scored two goals in this series, which is the lowest total scored by a team in a five-game series in NHL history.

(3) Carolina Hurricanes vs. (6) New Jersey Devils 
The Carolina Hurricanes entered the playoffs as the Southeast Division champions earning the third seed in the Eastern Conference with 91 points. The New Jersey Devils earned the sixth seed with 95 points. Although New Jersey finished the season with a better overall record and a higher point total, Carolina won their division so they were automatically placed in the top three seeds in the conference and were granted home ice advantage. This was the second playoff series between these two teams, with the only previous meeting being the 2001 Eastern Conference Quarterfinals where New Jersey won in six games.

(4) Toronto Maple Leafs vs. (5) New York Islanders 

The Toronto Maple Leafs entered the playoffs as the fourth seed in the Eastern Conference with 100 points. The New York Islanders earned the fifth seed with 96 points. This was the third playoff series between these two teams, the teams split the previous two playoff series. They last met in the 1981 Preliminary Round where New York won in three games.

Western Conference Quarterfinals

(1) Detroit Red Wings vs. (8) Vancouver Canucks 

The Detroit Red Wings entered the playoffs as the President's trophy winners, the Western Conference Regular season champions and the Central Division champions with 116 points. The Vancouver Canucks entered the playoffs as the eighth seed finishing the season with 94 points. This was the first playoff series between these two teams.

(2) Colorado Avalanche vs. (7) Los Angeles Kings 

The Colorado Avalanche entered the playoffs as the second seed in the Western Conference by winning the Northwest Division with 99 points, winning the tiebreaker with the San Jose Sharks in wins (45 to 44). The Los Angeles Kings earned 95 points during the regular season to finish seventh overall in the Western Conference, losing the tie-breaker in head-to-head points to Phoenix 7–3. This was the second playoff series between these two teams, they last met in the 2001 Western Conference Semifinals, which Colorado won in seven games.

(3) San Jose Sharks vs. (6) Phoenix Coyotes 

The San Jose Sharks entered the playoffs as the Pacific Division champions earning the third seed in the Western Conference with 99 points, losing the tiebreaker with the Colorado Avalanche in wins (45 to 44). The Phoenix Coyotes earned the sixth seed with 95 points, winning the tiebreaker with the Los Angeles Kings in head-to head points (7 to 3). This was the first and to date only playoff series between these two teams.

(4) St. Louis Blues vs. (5) Chicago Blackhawks
The St. Louis Blues entered the playoffs as the fourth seed in the Western Conference with 98 points. The Chicago Blackhawks earned the fifth seed with 96 points. This was the tenth playoff meeting between these two teams; with Chicago winning seven of the nine previous series. They last met in the 1993 Norris Division Semifinals, where the Blues swept the series in four games. Chicago won this year's five-game regular season series earning seven of ten points.

Conference Semifinals

Eastern Conference Semifinals

(3) Carolina Hurricanes vs. (8) Montreal Canadiens
This was the sixth playoff series between the two teams; with Montreal winning all five previous playoff series. They last met in the 1992 Adams Division Semifinals where Montreal defeated the Hartford Whalers in seven games. The teams split this year's four-game regular season series.

(4) Toronto Maple Leafs vs. (7) Ottawa Senators
This was the third consecutive playoff meeting and third postseason match-up between these two teams; with Toronto winning both previous series. Toronto won the previous year's Eastern Conference Quarterfinals in a four-game sweep. Ottawa won three of the five games in this year's regular season series. Before 2021, this was the most recent all-Canadian playoff series that was played after the opening round of the playoffs.

Western Conference Semifinals

(1) Detroit Red Wings vs. (4) St. Louis Blues
This was the seventh playoff meeting between these two teams; with Detroit winning four of the six previous series. They last met in the 1998 Western Conference Quarterfinals, which Detroit won in six games. Detroit won this year's five-game regular season series earning seven of ten points.

(2) Colorado Avalanche vs. (3) San Jose Sharks
This was the second playoff meeting between these two teams. Their only previous meeting was in the 1999 Western Conference Quarterfinals, which Colorado won in six games. Colorado won this year's four-game regular season series earning five of eight points.

Conference Finals

Eastern Conference Final

(3) Carolina Hurricanes vs. (4) Toronto Maple Leafs
This was the first playoff meeting between these two teams. The Hurricanes advanced to the Conference Finals for the first time in their 23rd season (fifth in Carolina) after entering the league in 1979 as the Hartford Whalers. This was Toronto's fourth appearance in the Conference Finals, they last appeared in the Conference Finals in 1999, which they lost to the Buffalo Sabres in five games. These teams split their four-game regular season series.

As of 2020, this series remains as the lowest scoring six-game playoff series in NHL history.

Western Conference Final

(1) Detroit Red Wings vs. (2) Colorado Avalanche
This was the fifth playoff meeting between these two teams, with Colorado winning three of the four previous series. They last met in the 2000 Western Conference Semifinals with Colorado winning in five games. This was Detroit's seventh Conference Finals appearance. They last went to the Western Conference Final in 1998, where they defeated the Dallas Stars in six games. This was Colorado's fourth consecutive and eighth appearance in the Conference Finals. They last went to the Western Conference Final in the previous year, which they won against the St. Louis Blues in five games. Detroit won three of the four games in this year's regular season series.

Game seven of this series, is the most one-sided game seven score in NHL history.

Stanley Cup Finals

This was the first playoff meeting between these two teams. Detroit made their twenty-second Finals appearance; their most recent appearance came in 1998 where they swept the Washington Capitals in four games. Carolina made their first Finals appearance in their twenty-third season since entering the league in 1979–80. The Hurricanes franchise had last played in a championship series when they were known as the New England Whalers in the WHA in 1978 where they were swept by the Winnipeg Jets. Detroit won both games in this year's regular season series.

Player statistics
Despite getting eliminated by the Red Wings in the Western Conference Final, Colorado forward Peter Forsberg led the playoffs in points with 18 assists and 9 goals. Brett Hull of the Detroit Red Wings led the playoffs with ten goals.

Skaters 
GP = Games played; G = Goals; A = Assists; Pts = Points; +/– = Plus/minus; PIM = Penalty minutes

Goaltending 
These are the top seven goaltenders based on goals against average with at least four games played.

GP = Games played; W = Wins; L = Losses; SA = Shots against; GA = Goals against; GAA = Goals against average; Sv% = Save percentage; TOI = Time On Ice (minutes:seconds); SO = Shutouts

See also
List of Stanley Cup champions
2001–02 NHL season
2002 in sports

Stanley Cup playoffs
playoffs